"This Beat Is Technotronic" is a song by Belgian dance music group Technotronic, released as the third single from their debut album, Pump Up the Jam: The Album (1989). Featuring MC Eric on vocals, the single found its greatest success on the Billboard Hot Dance Music/Club Play chart in the United States, where it hit number three. It also peaked at number 14 in the United Kingdom. It is the follow-up to Technotronic's second single, "Get Up! (Before the Night Is Over)".

Chart performance
"This Beat Is Technotronic" was a major hit on the charts on several continents. In Europe, it made it to the top 10 in Belgium, Finland, West Germany, the Netherlands and Switzerland with its best chart position as number seven in both Belgium and the Netherlands. Additionally, the single was a top 20 hit in France, Spain and the UK. In the latter, it peaked at number 14 in its third week at the UK Singles Chart, on April 15, 1990. In Italy, "This Beat Is Technotronic" was a top 30 hit, peaking at number 27. 

Outside Europe, the single reached number three on the Billboard Hot Dance Club Play chart in the US, number seven on the RPM Dance/Urban chart in Canada, number 27 in Australia and number 38 in New Zealand.

Critical reception
Upon the release, Bill Coleman from Billboard stated that "you know the beat, now catch the groove. Rack up another smash for the Belgian hip-house ensemble." He added, "Ya Kid K takes a rest so MC Eric can drop a little science accompanied by Chanelle and Karen Bernod (of Tribal House) on these new mixes." Harry Sumrall from Knight Ridder noted that it has the "cybernetic feel of Kraftwerk". Dave Jennings from Melody Maker wrote, "He'll never replace ol' blue lips this way. The sound's exactly the same as on the previous two hits, but Eric's flat rap scarcely lives up to the intriguing homoerotic packaging. This beat is over-familiar." Diana Valois from The Morning Call called it "a faceful of rap bravado". 

David Giles from Music Week wrote, "This could be the one that misses out. The absence of instant hooklines, and Big One Record's version of the same track released simultaneously may be to blame. Perhaps they will both be hits." Gene Sandbloom from The Network Forty felt the follow-up to "Pump Up the Jam" "defines their unique keyboard blend", adding that it is "a bit more tribal and perhaps more Devoesque than its predecessor". Terry Staunton  from NME commented, "Disappointing after the delight of the earlier record with Ya Kid K rapping her backside off. [...] Still, we'll find it grows on us as it blares out of the "bins" at various clubs. Not bad, but can do better."

Retrospective response
Retrospectively AllMusic editor Alex Henderson described "This Beat Is Technotronic" as "highly infectious". In an 2015 review, Pop Rescue stated that it "sees MC Eric 'take the microphone stand' and using his 'dope lyrics'", noting that the song is "pretty much a repetitive rap over the familiar bassy synth and hissing hi-hat sequence."

Music video
A music video was produced to promote the single. It was later published on Technotronic's official YouTube channel in June 2018, and had generated more than 748,000 views as of February 2023.

Track listings

 7" single
 "This Beat Is Technotronic" (single version) — 3:40
 "This Beat Is Technotronic" (rap to beats) — 3:15

 12" maxi
 "This Beat Is Technotronic" ("my favourite club" mix) — 5:57
 "This Beat Is Technotronic" (instrumental) — 4:00
 "This Beat Is Technotronic" (Alaska dub) — 5:00
 "This Beat Is Technotronic" (rap to beats) — 2:00

 12" maxi
 "This Beat Is Technotronic" (get on it club mix) — 7:40
 "This Beat Is Technotronic" (radio edit) — 4:50
 "This Beat Is Technotronic" (7" mix) — 3:30
 "This Beat Is Technotronic" (this dub is Technotronic) — 5:44
 "Pump Up the Jam" (punami mix) — 6:19
 "Tough" — 4:23

 CD single
 "This Beat Is Technotronic" ("my favourite club" mix) — 5:57
 "This Beat Is Technotronic" (single version) — 3:40
 "This Beat Is Technotronic" (Alaska dub) — 5:00
 "This Beat Is Technotronic" (rap to beats) — 3:15
 "This Beat Is Technotronic" (beats & bass) — 2:00

 CD maxi
 "This Beat Is Technotronic" (single version) — 3:40
 "This Beat Is Technotronic" ("my favourite club" mix) — 5:57
 "This Beat Is Technotronic" (Alaska dub) — 5:00
 "This Beat Is Technotronic" (rap to beats) — 3:15
 "This Beat Is Technotronic" (beats & bass) — 2:00

 Cassette
 "This Beat Is Technotronic" — (7" mix)
 "This Beat Is Technotronic" — (get on it 7" mix)
 "Pump Up The Jam" — (punami mix)
 "This Beat Is Technotronic" — (7" mix)
 "This Beat Is Technotronic" — (get on it 7" mix)
 "Pump Up The Jam" — (punami mix)

 12" maxi / CD maxi - Remixes
 "This Beat Is Technotronic" (get on it club mix) — 7:40
 "This Beat Is Technotronic" (get on it single mix) — 3:34
 "This Beat Is Technotronic" (radio edit) — 4:50
 "This Dub Is Technotronic" — 5:44

Personnel
 Vocals by MC Eric
 Produced by Jo Bogaert
 Artwork by Patrick F Cypen
 Photography by Koen Kampioen

Charts

Weekly charts

1 "This Beat Is Technotronic" by MC B. featuring Daisy Dee

Year-end charts

References

Songs about music
1990 singles
Technotronic songs
1989 songs
Acid house songs
SBK Records singles
EMI Records singles
Songs written by Jo Bogaert
English-language Belgian songs